Mokha, also spelled Mocha, or Mukha, is a port city on the Red Sea coast of Yemen. Until Aden and al Hudaydah eclipsed it in the 19th century, Mokha was the principal port for Yemen's capital, Sanaa.  Long known for its coffee trade, the city gave its name to Mocha coffee and chocolate.

Overview

Mocha was the major marketplace for coffee (Coffea arabica) from the 15th century until the early 18th century. Even after other sources of coffee were found, Mocha beans (also called Sanani or Mocha Sanani beans, meaning from Sana'a) continued to be prized for their distinctive flavor—and remain so even today. The coffee itself did not grow in Mocha, but was transported from Ethiopia and inland Yemen to the port in Mocha, where it was then shipped abroad.  Mocha's coffee legacy is reflected in the name of the mocha latte and the Moka pot coffee maker.  In Germany, traditional Turkish coffee is known as Mokka.

According to the Portuguese Jesuit missionary Jerónimo Lobo, who sailed the Red Sea in 1625, Mocha was "formerly of limited reputation and trade" but since "the Turkish assumption of power throughout Arabia, it has become the major city of the territory under Turkish domination, even though it is not the Pasha's place of residence, which is two days' journey inland in the city of Sana'a." Lobo adds that its importance as a port was also due to the Ottoman law that required all ships entering the Red Sea to put in at Mocha and pay duty on their cargoes.

History
Near modern-day Mocha was the important ancient emporium of Muza.

Mocha reached its zenith in the 17th century, owing to its trade in coffee. The city boasted a stone wall enclosing a citadel, as well as a labyrinth of thatched huts that surrounded the wall from without. Of these, some four hundred accommodated Jewish households that engaged in trade. Passing through Mocha in 1752 and 1756, Remedius Prutky found that it boasted a "lodging-house of the Prophet Muhammad, which was like a huge tenement block laid out in many hundred separate cells where accommodation was rented to all strangers without discrimination of race or religion." He also found a number of European ships in the harbor: three French, four English, two Dutch, and one Portuguese. In the 18th century, a plague killed half of the city's population, from which time the city never really recovered.

English, Dutch, and French companies maintained factories at Mocha, which remained a major emporium and coffee exporting port until the early 19th century. In August 1800 Phoenix visited. William Moffat, her captain, took the opportunity to prepare a chart of the mouth of the Red Sea.

Mocha was very dependent on imported coffee beans from present-day Ethiopia, which was exported by Somali merchants from Berbera across the Gulf of Aden. The Berbera merchants procured most of the coffee from the environs of Harar and shipped them off in their own vessels during the Berbera trading season. According to Captain Haines, who was the colonial administrator of Aden (1839–1854), Mocha historically imported up to two-thirds of their coffee from Berbera-based merchants before the coffee trade of Mocha was captured by British-controlled Aden in the 19th century. 

The Somalis of Berbera also had a navigation act where they excluded Arab vessels and brought the goods and produce of the interior in their own ships to Mocha and other Arabian ports:

Berbera held an annual fair during the cool rain-free months between October and April. This months-long market handled immense quantities of coffee, gum Arabic, myrrh and other commodities. In the early 19th century these goods were almost exclusively handled by Somalis who, Salt says, had "a kind of navigation act by which they exclude the Arab vessels from their ports and bring the produce of their country either to Aden or Mocha in their own dows."

Foreign observers at the time were quick to notice the Somalis who frequented Mocha. The majority of the Somalis arrived seasonally and stayed temporarily to trade in the goods they brought from the interior of the Horn of Africa. They were noted to be industrious in trade as well as keeping to the general peace:

The Samaulies, who inhabit the whole coast from Gardafui to the Straits [Bab-el-Mandeb], and through whose territories the whole produce of the interior of Africa must consequently reach Arabia, have been represented by Mr. Bruce, and many others, as a savage race, with whom it would be dangerous to have connection. I think that this is an unjust accusation, and is sufficiently disproved by the extent of their inland trade, their great fairs, and their large exports in their own vessels. A great number of them live close to Mocha, and are a peaceable inoffensive race.

Amidst the varied classes which are found in this town, the Soumalies, or natives of the opposite coast of Africa, are the most calculated to excite the attention of a stranger. Few reside here permanently, the greater number only remaining until their stock of sheep, gums, or coffee is disposed of.

In 1817, a British lieutenant was allegedly mistreated in Mocha, and the British Indian authorities requested that action be taken. However, the imam's governor turned down the British demand. In response, in December 1820, HMS Topaze and ships and troops belonging to the British East India Company attacked Mocha's North and South Forts, destroying them.

A decade and a half later, Ibrahim Pasha of Egypt would also attack the city and destroy its fortified wall closest to the sea, as well as its citadel. By that time, however, Mocha's trade in its country's precious commodity of coffee grains (Coffea arabica) had already been supplanted by Ethiopia, which was the principal trader of this commodity to North Africa and which sold for a third of the price of the same coffee imported from Arabia. 

Diplomat Edmund Roberts visited Mocha in the 1830s. He noted that Turkish "rebels" possessed Mocha. The Turks took it over after they left Egypt while being disgruntled with the rule of Muhammad Ali of Egypt. These "rebels", consisting of confederates throughout Arabia, had banded together under one leader named Turkie ben al Mas. Jacob Saphir who visited the city in 1859 wrote about seeing many houses that were vacant of dwellers, although the Turkish governor still dwelt there with a band of soldiers, collecting taxes from local traders and ships visiting the harbor. When the British took control over Aden, the port in Mocha fell into disuse, being replaced by Aden. The general destruction of the city was still prominent as late as 1909, when German explorer and photographer, Hermann Burchardt, wrote of the city Mocha as he saw it: “This card will reach you from one of the most godforsaken little places in Asia. It exceeds all my expectations, with regard to the destruction. It looks like a city entirely destroyed by earthquakes, etc.”

The Bialetti Moka pot stovetop pressurized espresso maker was named after the Yemini city by the Italian engineer inventor Alfonso Bialetti in 1933.  At the time Mocha was a famous leading producer and trader of coffee worldwide with a history going back 500 years, and also became known for its unique Yemini wild Mocha coffee beans. The Bialetti Moka pot became known as a brilliant functional iconic Futurist Art Deco design that it is still known as today.

Mocha was among the population centers in southern Yemen taken over by the Houthis during their military offensive in March 2015, and was bombed by an Arab coalition in July 2015. The city was attacked by pro-Hadi forces in January 2017 and captured by them the following month.

In 2021, an alleged attack by Houthi rebels, using ballistic missiles and drones, caused major damage to Mocha's port. The Associated Press reported that the attack on the port destroyed warehouses that aid organizations had been using.

Today, Mocha is no longer used as a major trade route, and the local economy is largely based on fishing and a small number of tourists.

Climate
The Köppen-Geiger climate classification system classifies Mokha's climate as hot desert (BWh).

See also
Mocha coffee bean
Caffè mocha
Almaqah

References

Further reading
Published in the 19th century
 
 
 
 

Published in the 20th century

External links 

Populated places in Taiz Governorate
Port cities and towns of the Red Sea
Sub-districts in Al-Makha District